Wiltz may refer to:
Geography
 Wiltz, a town and commune in north-western Luxembourg
 Wiltz (canton), a canton of Luxembourg named after the town
 Wiltz (river), a river in Belgium and Luxembourg that flows through the town
People
 Jason Wiltz (born 1976), American football player
 Louis A. Wiltz, (1843-1881), Louisiana politician
 Wendy Wiltz, American model from Louisiana
Other
 FC Wiltz 71, a football club in the town of Wiltz